The 2010 Continental Tire Sports Car Challenge was the tenth running of the Grand-Am Cup series and the first season under Continental Tire sponsorship. It began on January 29 at Daytona International Speedway and ended on September 12 at Miller Motorsports Park.

Despite winning only one race all season, top ten finishes in each of the ten races enabled Charles Espenlaub and Charles Putman of Fall-Line Motorsports to win the Grand Sport class title. Espenlaub and Putman finished six points clear of double race-winners Michael Marsal and Joey Hand of Turner Motorsport, and eight clear of another pair of double race-winners, Roush Performance's Jack Roush, Jr. and Billy Johnson. Rum Bum Racing's Matt Plumb won the most races, taking three victories – one victory with Gian Bacardi and two with Nick Longhi – but finished 80 points behind Espenlaub and Putman. Single race victories were taken by Rehagen Racing's Dean Martin and Bob Michaelian at Barber Motorsports Park, as well as The Racer's Group's Steve Bertheau and Spencer Pumpelly at Mid-Ohio.

The Street Tuner class was just as hotly contested as the Grand Sport class, and after ten races, the top two teams – Lawson Aschenbach and David Thilenius of Compass360 Racing, and Bill Heumann and Seth Thomas of BimmerWorld/GearWrench – finished tied on 274 points. Both teams took two victories and two second places, but the third place for Aschenbach and Thilenius at the final race of the season at Miller Motorsports Park allowed them to clinch the championship. Freedom Autosport pair Tom Long and Derek Whitis, and RSR Motorsports duo Randy Smalley and Owen Trinkler also took two victories over the season, with single victories claimed by APR Motorsport's Ian Baas and Aaron Povoledo, as well as the team-mates of Aschenbach and Thilenius, Ryan Eversley and Zach Lutz.

Debuting in 2010 was a new Mustang for Multimatic Motorsports painted to look like the Trans Am Series Boss 302s of Parnelli Jones and George Follmer. Also debuting was a new Sunoco sponsored Camaro resembling the original Penske Camaros of Trans Am.

Schedule
The schedule was announced on October 15, 2009. Nine of the ten rounds supported the 2010 Rolex Sports Car Series, with a stand-alone round at Circuit Trois-Rivières.

Calendar

References

External links
 Official Website

2010
Continental Tire Sports Car Challenge